This is a list of characters for the manga and anime series Golden Kamuy.

Sugimoto's group
 
 
 A demobilized soldier and veteran of the Russo-Japanese War. He served a private first class in the 1st Division of the Imperial Japanese Army, and fought in the battle of 203 Hill. He was feared for his savage fighting style and amazing toughness on the battlefield, gaining the nickname .
 Asirpa
 
 A young Ainu hunter who meets Sugimoto after saving him from a wild bear, and later partners with him to find the gold. She seeks to avenge her father, who she believes was murdered by hunters searching for the gold.
 
 
 A tattooed Abashiri convict and master escape artist. He is initially captured by Sugimoto, and later agrees to a truce after they need each other's help to survive the bitter cold after they fall in a river. He is based on Yoshie Shiratori.
 Genjirō Tanigaki
 See Genjirō Tanigaki.
 Kiroranke
 See Kiroranke.

Hijikata’s group
 
 
 A fictionalized version of the Shinsengumi commander of the same name who fought against the Meiji Restoration. Assumed to have been dead for decades, he was held in secret as a political prisoner before escaping alongside the tattooed convicts. He forms a group to search for the gold, which he plans to use to fund the secession of Hokkaido and creation of a second Republic of Ezo.
 
 
 A fictionalized version of the Shinsengumi captain of the same name. Loyal to Hijikata, he learns he is still alive while working as the swordsmanship instructor for the guards at Kabato Prison.
 
 
 A muscled judoka who killed his master. He allies himself with Hijikata in pursuit of the gold, but does not share his nationalistic ambitions.
 Kadokura
 See Kadokura.
 
 
 A blind, elderly prisoner who uses echolocation to find his victims.
 
  
 Hidoro's minion who later joins Hijikata's group.
 Kirawus
 
 An Ainu hunter. He works with Kadokura to support Hijikata's group.
 Kano Ienaga
 See Kano Ienaga.
 Hyakunosuke Ogata
 See Hyakunosuke Ogata.

The Hokkaido 7th Division
 
 
 A first lieutenant, platoon leader and military intelligence officer in the 7th Division of the Imperial Japanese Army. Harboring a grudge against the Japanese government for their failure to extract remuneration from Russia for Japanese veterans of the Russo-Japanese War, he seeks to use the Ainu gold to lead a coup d'état to form an independent Hokkaido. His forehead is covered by a ceramic plate, due to a head injury he sustained from an artillery bombardment during the Russo-Japanese War. Consequently, he suffers from the after effects of severe brain damage, including mood swings and sudden outbursts of violence.
 
 
 A superior private and sniper in the 7th Division. Ogata tried unsuccessfully to corrupt Yuusaku Hanazawa, his virtuous younger half-brother and legitimate son of Kojirō, but eventually shoots him during the Battle of 203 Hill. He is skeptical about Tsurumi's ambitions and deserts the army, initially joining Hijikata's group. He later joins the Sugimoto group, however he eventually colludes with Kiroranke to find the gold.
 
 
 A Matagi and a private first class of the 7th Division who joined the army to find the matagi  who killed his sister . After an extended stay in a kotan (Ainu village) to recover from an injury, he joins Sugimoto's group to fulfill a promise to Asirpa's grandmother to bring Asirpa home safely.
 
 
 A sergeant in the 7th Division. Stoic and serious, he often acts as the straight man to Tsurumi's and Koito's eccentric personalities. He grew up on the island of Sado where he was persecuted because of his violent and brutal father. He loved a woman called Igogusa, so named because of her seaweed-like hair, but when he returned from the Russo-Japanese War, he found that his father had told Igogusa that Hajime was dead and she apparently threw herself into the sea. Tsurumi approached Tsukishima when he was on death row in prison after killing his father and Tsurumi manipulated him into joining the 7th Division and becoming a Russian interpreter. Tsukishima became so loyal to Tsurumi that he risked his own life to save Tsurumi during a Russian artillery bombardment when Tsurumi lost part of his forehead.
 
 
 A second lieutenant in the 7th from Satsuma. As a naval cadet and spoiled son of wealthy Commander Heiji Koito, he was kidnapped by Russian agents and saved by Tsurumi to whom he became fiercely loyal. He is intelligent although sheltered and inexperienced, but is an excellent swordsman.  
 
 
 A private first class in the 7th Division. Seeks revenge for his twin brother, who was killed by Sugimoto. A running gag in the series is how he continuously loses body parts following his encounters with Sugimoto.
  
 
 A superior private in the 7th Division. He is unfailingly loyal to Tsurumi; when Tsurumi turned two moles on Usami's face into stick figures with a fountain pen, Usami had them turned into tattoos.
 
 
 A Warrant Officer of the 7th Division who collects rare weapons. His favorite weapon is the Nagant M1895. He was also an older-brother figure to Sugimoto.
 
 
 An Ainu man and a Private First Class of the 7th Division. His Ainu name is Ipopte (イポㇷ゚テ, Ipopte) and his father was one of the men killed by Noppera-bo. Tsurumi discovers that he is secretly working with Hijikata and turns him into a double agent.
 
 
 He was the Second Lieutenant of the 7th Division and the Flag-Bearer during Russo-Japanese War and Ogata's younger half-brother.

The Abashiri Prison
 
 
 The Abashiri Prison warden, an experienced swordsman.
 
 
 The head jailer of Abashiri Prison who collaborates with Hijikata. He tends to have poor luck which he attributes to being born under a bad star, however sometimes his poor choices have a beneficial result.
 Tokishige Usami
 See Usami.

The Abashiri Convicts
 
 
 A pseudonymous prisoner who murdered seven Ainu to steal and hide a large quantity of gold, the location of which is in a treasure map in the form of tattoos painted on the bodies of 24 prisoners. His true identity is Wilk.
 Yoshitake Shiraishi
 See Yoshitake Shiraishi.
 Toshizō Hijikata
 See Toshizō Hijikata.
 Tatsuuma Ushiyama
 See Tatsuuma Ushiyama.
 
 
 A murderer who drunkenly informed Sugimoto of the existence of the tattooed skins.
 
 
 A famous bear hunter who is fixated on killing Retar, one of the last Hokkaido wolves.
 
 
 A serial killer with masochistic tendencies.
 
 
 Originally named , a transgender woman and former doctor who feeds on the flesh of her victims to become youthful and beautiful.
 
 
 A yakuza boss, and Nakazawa's lover.
 
 
 A con man and expert impressionist.
 
 
 
 A scholar and zoophile. His appearance is based on Ernest Thompson Seton.
 
 
 A martial artist who escaped north to the island of Sakhalin and specializes in the Russian fighting sport of stenka. He relished his time in prison as an opportunity to indulge in the hand to hand combat through which he sought fulfilment. 
 
 
He moved to Nemuro on the island of Sakhalin 30 years earlier and married an Ainu woman, but was sent to Abashiri Prison after killing the man who took his wife hostage. 
 
 
 A veterinarian and expert in poisons. He lost faith in god after his daughter was struck and killed by lightning and he placed his victims in life or death situations which would determine their fate. He is eventually killed by Hijikata who survived one of Sekiya's traps.

The Ainu
 Asirpa
 See Asirpa.
 Wilk
 
 Asirpa's biological father. He is a mixed Polish and Karafuto Ainu who fled to Hokkaido. He stole the Ainu gold and assumed the pseudonym Noppera-bo, his ultimate goal being to use it to start an Ainu revolution against the Japanese government, with his daughter as their leader. 
 Kiroranke
 
 A friend of Asirpa's father and veteran of the 7th Division. A revolutionary and partisan in Russia, he assassinated Alexander II with Wilk at the age of 15, and seeks to use the gold to mount an invasion of Hokkaido.
 Inkarmat
 
 A sly and cunning Ainu fortune-teller. Though Asirpa calls her "Cironnup" ("fox" in Ainu) and dismisses her as a scam artist, many of her prophecies have proven true. As a child she became acquainted with Wilk, which led to her affection for Asirpa later in life.
 Asirpa's grandmother ("Huci")
 
 An elderly woman who raised Asirpa following the death of her parents.
 Cikapasi
 
 An orphaned Ainu boy who travels with Tanigaki and Inkarmat.
 Osoma
 
 Asirpa's cousin.
 Makanakkuru
 
 Asirpa's uncle and Osoma's father.
 Enonoka
 
 A Karafuto Ainu girl.

Others
 Retar
 One of the last surviving Hokkaido wolves.
 
 Nihei's Hokkaido dog.
 
 
 A Russian sniper pursuing Wilk and Kiroranke. During his pursuit, he is caught in a sniper duel with Ogata, during which he ends up shot in the mouth. He starts pursuing Ogata after this, continuously following Sugimoto's group to catch Ogata.
 )
 
 A descendant of Russian aristocracy, and leader of the Russian partisans.
 
 
 A taxidermist who secretly preserves the bodies of humans. He is employed by Tsurumi to create fake tattooed skins.
 
  
 A yakuza, and Wakayama's lover.
 
  
 A counterfeit painter, and Shiraishi's former cellmate at Kabato Prison.
  
 
 A fictionalized version of the poet of the same name. A journalist.
 
 
 A fictionalized version of the photographer of the same name. An old friend of Hijikata.

References

External links
  
  
 

Golden Kamuy